The 1955–56 FAW Welsh Cup is the 69th season of the annual knockout tournament for competitive football teams in Wales.

Key
League name pointed after clubs name.
B&DL - Birmingham & District League
CCL - Cheshire County League
FL D1 - Football League First Division
FL D2 - Football League Second Division
FL D3N - Football League Third Division North
FL D3S - Football League Third Division South
SFL - Southern Football League

Fifth round
Nine winners from the Fourth round and seven new clubs.

Sixth round

Semifinal
Swansea Town and Newport County played at Cardiff, Oswestry Town and Cardiff City played at Wrexham.

Final
Final were held at Cardiff.

External links
The FAW Welsh Cup

1955-56
Wales
Cup